Ipl2 or IPL2 may refer to
 2009 Indian Premier League, the second season of the Indian Premier League
 IGN Pro League season 2
 Internet Public Library, following its merger with the Librarians' Internet Index